Deccan Development Society is an Indian agri-based NGO in Medak district in the state of Telangana, India. It works on various crop improvement programs and activities helping the local farmers. The Women Sangams (groups) of Deccan Development Society (DDS) were honoured with Equator Prize 2019 by United Nations Development Programme (UNDP) for their contribution to ecology and innovations in rainfed millet cultivation.

History
It is a two-decade-old grassroots organization working in about 75 villages with women's societies. The organization envisions consolidating these village groups into vibrant organs of primary local governance and federate them into a strong pressure lobby for women, the poor and dalits.

The organisation
The Deccan Development society is projecting a working model for the people-oriented participative development in the areas of food security, ecological agriculture, and alternate education. It is also trying to reverse the historical process of degradation of the environment and people's livelihood system in this region through a string of land-related activities such as Permaculture, Community Grain Bank, Community Gene Fund, Community Green Fund and Collective Cultivation through land Lease etc. These activities, alongside taking on the role of Earth care, are also resulting in human care, by giving the women a new found dignity and profile in their village communities. The society is trying to relocate the people's knowledge in the area of health and agriculture.

Its present director is P. V. Sateesh.

Awards
Prince Albert II of Monaco Foundation Award - June 2020

References

External links
Official website

Rural community development
Medak district
Agricultural organisations based in India